Josip "Mićo" Duvančić (born 1 October 1935) is a Croatian former football player and manager.

Beside coaching a number of Yugoslav teams, he also managed Turkish side Sarıyer.

He played during his early career with Budućnost Zemun.

References

External links
 
 Career story at Hajduk Split official website 
 
 Stats at Partizan official website
 

1935 births
Living people
People from Promina, Croatia
Association football forwards
Yugoslav footballers
FK Partizan players
FK Vojvodina players
FK Sloboda Tuzla players
İzmirspor footballers
Yugoslav First League players
Yugoslav expatriate footballers
Expatriate footballers in Turkey
Yugoslav expatriate sportspeople in Turkey
Yugoslav football managers
Croatian football managers
FK Sloboda Tuzla managers
HNK Hajduk Split managers
FK Radnički Niš managers
FK Partizan managers
NK Osijek managers
FK Vojvodina managers
FK Budućnost Podgorica managers
Sarıyer S.K. managers
FC Prishtina managers
FK Spartak Subotica managers
Yugoslav expatriate football managers
Expatriate football managers in Turkey